Nova Brasilândia d'Oeste is a municipality located in the Brazilian state of Rondônia. Its population was 20,489 (2020) and its area is 1,703 km².

References

Municipalities in Rondônia